Wenshu Guangfa Tianzun is a Taoist deity and character in the classic Chinese novel Investiture of the Gods (more commonly known as Fengshen Yanyi). He is a disciple of Yuanshi Tianzun and one of the Three Great Immortals. The character is believed to be derived from the bodhisattva Manjusri. The books Qunxian Xianpo Tianmen and Western Tang Dynasty Biography states Wenshu Guangfa Tianzun and Manjusri Bodhisattva are not the same person.

Legend
In Fengshen Yanyi, Guangfa Tianzun is the superiorman over Five Dragons Mountain, Cloud Top Cave and the renowned teacher of Jinzha, the first son of Li Jing. In rank, Guangfa Tianzun is seemingly an elite superiorman—even greater than that of Nezha's teacher Taiyi Zhenren.

After a fine duel had ensued between Muzha and Nezha and Li Jing attempted his first suicide, Guangfa Tianzun would appear. Once Guangfa Tianzun had ordered Li Jing to enter his cave for safety, he would personally settle things with the "spoiled brat" Nezha. Once Nezha's temper raged and he thrust his spear continuously at Guangfa Tianzun, Guangfa Tianzun would side step and throw his legendary Seven Treasure Golden Lotus over Nezha's head. Nezha would lose consciousness quickly following this and would find himself tied to a large gold post while cuffed by golden rings. Soon enough, Guangfa Tianzun would order Jinzha, his student, to flog Nezha. Following the arrival of Nezha's teacher, Taiyi Zhenren, it would be revealed that the whole event between Li Jing and Nezha had been set by Taiyi Zhenren as a chance to teach Nezha some discipline. After Nezha greeted Guangfa Tianzun and his master - who was sitting to Guangfa Tianzun's right - Nezha would have a great level of inner resent.

Following the leave of Nezha and Li Jing upon Guangfa Tianzun's order, Guangfa Tianzun would not be seen again for quite some time.

References

 Investiture of the Gods chapter 14 pages 167 - 169

Investiture of the Gods characters
Deities in Taoism
Chinese gods